KNNZ ("89.1 Ken's FM") is a radio station owned by Pioneer Public Broadcasting, licensed to Hawley, Minnesota and serving the Fargo–Moorhead area. The station's offices are located in Fargo, North Dakota, while its transmitter is located at Barnesville, Minnesota.

History
The station went on-air at 94.5 FM in 2000 as a pirate radio station. The pirate radio station played a modern rock format known as "New Rock 94.5."

In 2009, the Federal Communications Commission sent a letter to the pirate radio station forcing it to cease operations.

In 2010, the owner of the pirate radio station received a Construction Permit from the FCC for a new FM radio station at 89.1 MHz (licensed to Hawley, Minnesota) with the callsign KNNZ.

On December 31, 2012, KNNZ officially signed on the air branded as "89.1 Ken's FM" (named after the station President, Ken Bartz) with the same modern rock format that the pirate radio station had carried.

In 2015, KNNZ upgraded to 100,000 watts of power.

External links

References

Radio stations in Minnesota
Radio stations established in 2012
2012 establishments in Minnesota